Sreedhar (born Sreedhar Surapaneni) was an Indian actor from Andhra Pradesh, who has predominantly acted in Telugu films. He started acting in small roles in early 70s. He became popular with  Mutyala Muggu in 1975 directed by Bapu. He proved himself as a versatile actor by playing hero, villain and other supporting characters in over 150 films. He died on 11 July 2007 in Hyderabad because of cardiac arrest. He was survived by his wife and three daughters.
He was born and brought up in Kummamuru, Krishna district.

Filmography
Rowdilaku Rowdilu (1971) - guest role
"Mangalya bhagyam" (1974)
Alluri Seetarama Raju (1974)
Mutyala Muggu (1975)
Yashoda Krishna (1975)
Bhakta Kannappa (1976)
America Ammayi (1976)
Bangaru Manishi (1976)
Adavi Ramudu (1977)
Bommarillu (1978)
Shri Rama Pattabhishekam (1978)
Karunamayudu (1978)
Seetamalakshmi (1978)
Kaliyuga Ravanaasurudu (1978)
Goranta Deepam(1978)
Driver Ramudu (1979)
Judagadu (1979)
Podarillu (1980)
Kodalu Vastunaru Jagratha (1980) as Vasu
 Mayadari Krishnudu (1980)
 Jatara (1981)
Justice Chowdary (1982)
Eenadu (1982)
Kirayi Kotigadu (1983)
Kirai Dada (1987)
Govinda Govinda (1994)

References

External links

Telugu male actors
2007 deaths
Indian male film actors